He Saifei (born 11 April 1963) is a Chinese actress of film and television, as well as a celebrated Yue opera performer of dan (female) roles. Internationally, she is best known for playing supporting roles in period films like Raise the Red Lantern (1991) and Temptress Moon (1996).

He Saifei is the most famous disciple of Yue opera star Zhang Yunxia.

Early life
He Saifei was born in 1963 in an island in Daishan County, Zhoushan off the coast of mainland Zhejiang province. She has two sisters. When she was 3, the Cultural Revolution began. In 1967, her father was attacked and sent to the countryside. Her parents divorced, and Saifei lived with one parent while her two sisters lived with another, with no contact between them. After the Cultural Revolution ended in 1976, Yue opera (also known as Yue opera) gradually regained its popularity following a decade of ruinous destruction. When He Saifei was about 16, she successfully auditioned for a Yue opera troupe in Daishan. There she met a slightly younger girl who was also very interested in joining. Neither knew at first, but it turned out that the girl Xia Saili (夏赛丽) was none other than her long-lost sister. After some initial discomfort, they became very close and encouraged each other. In 1983–84, both made the newly established Zhejiang Xiaobaihua Yue Opera Troupe, which, consisting entirely of young girls would immediately take the Yue opera world by storm. He Saifei studied under the master Zhang Yunxia and specialized in Dan (female) roles. Xia Saili specialized in Sheng (mainly male scholar) roles, and as a result often portrayed her sister's lover on stage. Another of He Saifei's frequent on-stage partner was Mao Weitao.

Early career
In 1984, the Zhejiang Xiaobaihua Yue Opera Troupe girls starred in the opera film Five Daughters Offering Felicitations (五女拜壽), which became a big national hit and won Best Opera Film (a new award category) at the 5th Golden Rooster Awards. In 1985, He Saifei and Mao Weitao reenacted a scene live at the CCTV New Year's Gala, China's most watched annual television event. This would be the first of He Saifei's four Yue opera appearances on CCTV New Year's Gala (excluding more performances on CCTV New Year's Opera Gala). Soon enough, He Saifei and four other girls from Xiaobaihua — Mao Weitao, He Ying (何英), Fang Xuewen (方雪雯), and Dong Kedi (董柯娣) — emerged as young celebrities, and they were together dubbed the "Five Golden Flowers" (五朵金花) of Yue opera.

Personal life
She has one son, born in 1998.

Filmography

Film

Television

Awards and nominations

Yue opera

Film & TV

References

External links

Biography of He Saifei

Actresses from Zhejiang
1963 births
People from Daishan County
Living people
Chinese film actresses
Chinese television actresses
21st-century Chinese actresses
20th-century Chinese actresses
Yue opera actresses
Singers from Zhejiang
20th-century Chinese women singers
21st-century Chinese women singers